Panagiotis Karachalios (born 4 November 1987) is a Greek footballer who plays for Olympiakos Neon Liosion  as a winger.

Career
Born in Athens, Karachalios began playing football with Acharnaikos F.C. He also played for Ethnikos Piraeus F.C., Aias Salamina F.C., Panargiakos F.C., A.O. Glyfada F.C. and Paniliakos F.C.

References

External links
 
 Myplayer Profile
 Profile at Onsports.gr

1987 births
Living people
Acharnaikos F.C. players
Ethnikos Piraeus F.C. players
Aias Salamina F.C. players
Panargiakos F.C. players
Paniliakos F.C. players
A.O. Nea Ionia F.C. players
Ionikos F.C. players
Association football wingers
Footballers from Athens
Greek footballers